Rhene cancer is a jumping spider in the genus Rhene that lives in Zimbabwe. The male was first identified in 2008.

References

Salticidae
Endemic fauna of Zimbabwe
Spiders of Africa
Spiders described in 2008
Taxa named by Wanda Wesołowska